Zalmay, Zalmai, Zalmeh, or Zalmie is a Pashtun male given name found amongst the Pashtuns of Pakistan and Afghanistan. Its meaning is loosely translated as "youth" or "young man". In Afghanistan, the name appears amongst non-Pashtuns as well.

Zalmai Aziz (born 1940), former Afghan Ambassador to the Russian Federation
Zalmay A. Gulzad, professor, author, lecturer and researcher into contemporary Afghan politics
Zalmay Khalilzad (born 1951), counselor at the Center for Strategic and International Studies (CSIS) and president of Khalilzad Associates

Afghan masculine given names